Michael Ngemba Luyambula (born 8 June 1999) is a professional footballer who plays as a goalkeeper for Regionalliga West club Sportfreunde Lotte.

Born in Germany, Luyambula came through Borussia Dortmund's youth system but was released without playing for the club's first team. He joined English second-tier club Birmingham City in 2018. He spent time on loan to Hungerford Town of the National League South in 2018–19, to League Two club Crawley Town in 2019–20, during which he played in the EFL Cup and EFL Trophy, and to AFC Telford United of the National League North in 2020. Released by Birmingham at the end of the 2019–20 season, he returned to Germany with VfB Lübeck, newly promoted to the 3. Liga. He moved on to Sportfreunde Lotte for the 2021–22 season.

Luyambula was named in a long list for the DR Congo under-20 team in 2018, and was called up to the senior squad's training camp in June 2017.

Club career

Early life and club career
Luyambula was born in Neumünster, Germany. As a youngster he played for TSV Kronshagen before joining Borussia Dortmund's youth system as an under-12. He was an unused substitute for Borussia Dortmund II in a couple of Regionalliga matches in 2018, but was released without playing for the club's first team.

Birmingham City
Luyambula joined English Championship club Birmingham City on trial, and signed a short-term contract in August 2018. In compliance with transfer restrictions imposed on the club by the English Football League, he could play only for Birmingham's under-23 team, for which he made 12 appearances in the first half of the 2018–19 season.

Hungerford Town
He also spent three weeks on loan to Hungerford Town of the sixth-tier National League South in October, during which he made his senior debut in their FA Cup third qualifying round defeat by Wealdstone. In mid-December, he returned to Hungerford on loan for an initial month, and after the EFL gave their permission for his Birmingham contract to be extended to the end of the season, the loan was likewise extended. Luyumbula was the regular goalkeeper during the second half of Hungerford's season. He made 20 league appearances and helped his team avoid relegation in the final fixture.

Crawley Town
After Luyambula signed a one-year contract with Birmingham, he joined League Two (fourth-tier) club Crawley Town on loan for the 2019–20 season. Crawley manager Gabriele Cioffi hoped he would "put pressure on" established first-team goalkeeper Glenn Morris. Luyambula made his first competitive appearance for Crawley in the starting eleven for the EFL Cup first-round match away to Walsall on 13 August 2019; his team won 3–2. He kept his place for the next rounds of the competition, "punching and catching everything Norwich flung into his six-yard area" and keeping a clean sheet as Crawley beat the Premier League team, and then facing a penalty shoot-out to eliminate Stoke City. He also appeared in the EFL Trophy, but made no league appearances, and was recalled by his parent club in January 2020 with the intention of finding first-team football for him.

AFC Telford United
Luyambula signed for AFC Telford United on 30 January 2020 on loan until 16 May. He played five times in the National League North before the season was first suspended and then ended early because of the COVID-19 pandemic.

Birmingham confirmed in May 2020 that he would be released when his contract expired at the end of the season.

Return to German football
Luyambula returned to his native northern Germany and, on 4 June, signed a one-year contract with VfB Lübeck, newly promoted to the 3. Liga for the 2020–21 season. He spent the season as backup to Lukas Raeder, made no first-team appearances, and signed for Regionalliga West club Sportfreunde Lotte in August 2021 after a trial.

International career
Luyambula was named in a 58-man long list for the DR Congo under-20 team in 2018, and was called up to the senior squad's training camp in June 2017.

Career statistics

Notes

References

1999 births
Living people
People from Neumünster
German footballers
Democratic Republic of the Congo footballers
Association football goalkeepers
Borussia Dortmund players
Borussia Dortmund II players
Birmingham City F.C. players
Hungerford Town F.C. players
Crawley Town F.C. players
AFC Telford United players
VfB Lübeck players
Sportfreunde Lotte players
National League (English football) players
Footballers from Schleswig-Holstein